William George Grieve Forrest (24 September 1925 – 14 October 1997), known as George Forrest, was a British classicist and academic. From 1977 to 1992, he was Wykeham Professor of Ancient History at the University of Oxford.

Early life and education
George Forrest was born in Glasgow and educated at University College School, Hampstead.

In 1943 he joined the RAF, and in the following years of World War II and post-War liberation he served in France and Belgium.

Forrest entered New College as a scholar in 1947, took a first in Classical Moderations in 1949, and another in Literae Humaniores in 1951. In his final term he won the Derby Scholarship, usually awarded for travel abroad.

Academic career
In 1951 he was elected to a Tutorial Fellowship in Ancient History at Wadham College, which he held until 1977.

In 1977 he was elected Wykeham Professor of Ancient History and accordingly became a Fellow of New College, where he remained until his retirement in 1992.

Political views 
Forrest was fiercely political and liberal in his views ("George was profoundly political, always a democrat and so, it followed naturally, always a socialist"), and worked tirelessly to free Greece from the Greek military junta of 1967–1974.

He was also a strong supporter of the campaign to return the Elgin Marbles to Athens and was one of the original members of the British Committee for the Reunification of the Parthenon Marbles.

Death
He died of cancer in 1997, five years after retiring.

Select works
 The Emergence of Greek Democracy (1966)
 A History of Sparta, 950–192 B.C. (1968)

References

Sources
 Obituary (The Independent)

British classical scholars
Alumni of New College, Oxford
Fellows of New College, Oxford
Fellows of Wadham College, Oxford
People educated at University College School
1925 births
1997 deaths
Wykeham Professors of Ancient History
Classical scholars of the University of Oxford
Historians of antiquity
20th-century British historians
Royal Air Force personnel of World War II